Bhimsen is a rāgam in Carnatic music and Hindustani music(Indian classical music scale) created by music composer . named after ‘Bharat Ratna’ Pandit Bhimsen Joshi (BHIM) Miaya Tansen (SEN). It is the Janya raga of 11th Melakarta rāgam Kokilapriya in the 72 melakarta rāgam system of Carnatic music.  introduced this raga to Indian classical music by composing two Hindustani Bandish.

Structure and Lakshana 

Bhimsen is an asampoorna rāgam (asymmetric scale) that does not contain rishabham and dhaivatam in the ascending scale. It is an audava-sampurna rāgam (owdava rāgam, means pentatonic in ascending scale).  of this raga as follows.

 : 
 : 

The notes used in this raga are shadjam, sadharana gandharam, shuddha madhyamam, kakali nishadham in the arohanam and shuddha rishabham and  chathusruthi dhaivatham added in the avarohanam of the raga. It is a audava - sampurna rāgam.

Compositions 

 'Giridhar Gopal Shyam' Roopaktal, Vilambith and Madhyalay Bandish written and composed by  sung by Jayateerth Mevundi
 'Man ke Mandir Ayore' Teental drut Bandish written and composed by  sung by Jayateerth Mevundi

Notes

References 

Janya ragas
Hindustani ragas